"Cast Your Fate to the Wind" is an American jazz instrumental selection by Vince Guaraldi; later, a lyric was written by Carel Werber. It won a Grammy Award for Best Original Jazz Composition in 1963.

It was included on the album Jazz Impressions of Black Orpheus (credited to the Vince Guaraldi Trio), released by Fantasy Records on April 18, 1962.

Fantasy actually released "Cast Your Fate to the Wind" as the B-side of the bossa nova-flavored "Samba de Orpheus" single. However, U.S. radio disc jockeys preferred the more accessible, catchy "Cast Your Fate to the Wind", propelling it to No. 22 on the Billboard Hot 100 pop chart and No. 9 on the Easy Listening chart. In an effort to exploit the unexpected popularity of the song, Fantasy retitled Jazz Impressions of Black Orpheus as Cast Your Fate to the Wind for future album pressings.

On some copies of the album, the label title contained a printing error; it read "Cast Your Faith to the Wind", an unintentionally comic twist to the sentiment of the song.

Peanuts
Peanuts producer Lee Mendelson cited "Cast Your Fate to the Wind" as the tune he heard on the radio that prompted him to commission Guaraldi to compose music cues for the 1963 documentary A Boy Named Charlie Brown, which was ultimately not broadcast due to a lack of sponsorship. The resulting album, Jazz Impressions of A Boy Named Charlie Brown, proved to be popular enough to retain Guaraldi's services for A Charlie Brown Christmas. The collaboration between Guaraldi and the Peanuts franchise lasted until Guaraldi's death in February 1976 at age 47.

Cover versions

"Cast Your Fate to the Wind" has been covered by many artists in a wide range of genres, including both male and female solo vocalists, pop, folk, and rock groups, as well as many instrumental performers.
 In Australia, a vocal version by Mel Tormé was a hit in 1963.
 In 1965, the British easy listening group Sounds Orchestral redirected the tune away from the jazz-influenced midsection to more of a nightclub sound and concluded the tune with a short piano section. That version attained No. 5 in the UK, No. 10 on the US Billboard Hot 100 chart, and No. 1 on the US Easy Listening chart.
 In 1966, North Hollywood singer Shelby Flint released a version of the song which peaked at No. 61 on the Hot 100 and No. 11 on the Easy Listening chart.
 The West Coast folk-rock bands We Five and The Sandpipers, along with pop singer Johnny Rivers, recorded vocal versions of the song
Further instrumental recordings from Earl Klugh, George Benson, David Benoit, Chet Atkins, George Winston, Allen Toussaint, and Nelson Rangell.
 In 1970, the rock group James Gang covered the song as part of a three-song medley ("The Bomber Medley") on their album James Gang Rides Again.
 Quincy Jones rendered an orchestral arrangement of the tune on his 1971 album Smackwater Jack.
 In 1976, an easy listening version was recorded by guitarist Harald Winkler and the Norman Candler Orchestra. 
 In 2007, alternative rock band They Might Be Giants spoofed the tune's title by issuing "Cast Your Pod to the Wind", a bonus disc to their album The Else. It consisted of songs which, before then, had only been heard on their podcasts.
 The song has been rendered, with French lyrics, as both "Ne tremble pas mon pauvre coeur" (1965) recorded by Marianne Mille (fr) and also as "Le nez dans le vent" (1967) recorded by Shirley Théroux (fr).

In film
The song was featured in the 1980s films Good Morning, Vietnam (1987) and The In Crowd (1988).
Allen Toussaint's version is the first ending theme for the 2013 film The Wolf of Wall Street.

Charts

Personnel
Vince Guaraldi Trio
Vince Guaraldi – piano
Colin Bailey – drums
Monty Budwig – double bass

See also
List of number-one adult contemporary singles of 1965 (U.S.)
List of jazz standards

References

1960s instrumentals
1962 songs
1965 singles
Cameo-Parkway Records singles
Compositions by Vince Guaraldi
Fantasy Records singles
Jazz compositions in A-flat major
Johnny Rivers songs
Pop instrumentals
Pop standards
Pye Records singles
Song recordings produced by John Schroeder (musician)
We Five songs